Somatidia testudo is a species of beetle in the family Cerambycidae. It was described by Broun in 1904.

References

testudo
Beetles described in 1904